Thaumatogryllus is a genus of crickets in the family Gryllidae.  It currently consists of four species, all of which are endemic to Hawaii. Though very little is known about any of these species, it can be confirmed that T. conantae shows obvious signs of island gigantism. The other three species, especially T. cavicola, may also be affected by this phenomenon.

Species
Thaumatogryllus cavicola - volcanoes cave cricket (island of Hawaii)
This cricket spends its entire life on the ceiling of lava tubes. If it were to descend to the floor, it would quickly be eaten by hunting spiders. It likes to eat roots that hang from the ceiling.
Thaumatogryllus conanti D. Otte, 1994 - Conant's giant Nihoa tree cricket (Nihoa)
Thaumatogryllus mauiensis - (Maui)
Thaumatogryllus variegatus - Kauai thin-footed bush cricket (Kauai)

Tree crickets
Insects of Hawaii
Endemic fauna of Hawaii